Liuliqiao is an interchange station on Line 9 and Line 10 of the Beijing Subway. It is located along Guang'an Road to the southwest of Liuliqiao, the intersection between the 3rd Ring Road and the northern terminus of the G4 Beijing–Hong Kong and Macau Expressway.

Station Layout 
The line 9 station has 2 underground side platforms. The line 10 station has an underground island platform. The line 10 platforms are located under then line 9 platforms.

Exits 
There are 6 exits, lettered A, B, C, D, E, and F. Exit C is accessible.

Gallery

References

External links

Beijing Subway stations in Fengtai District
Railway stations in China opened in 2011